Lívia Renata dos Santos Souza (born March 11, 1991), also known as Livinha Souza, is a Brazilian mixed martial artist who competes in the Strawweight division. She has previously competed in the UFC and Invicta Fighting Championships, where she is the former Invicta FC Strawweight Champion.

Mixed martial arts career

Early career
Souza made her professional MMA debut in March 2013. Over the next two years, she amassed an undefeated record of 7 wins and no losses and one no contest.

Invicta FC
In her Invicta FC debut, Souza defeated Katja Kankaanpää to win the Strawweight title at Invicta FC 12: Kankaanpää vs. Souza. Just like fellow Brazilian and former Invicta FC Atomweight Champion Herica Tiburcio, Souza went on to win the title in her very first fight on both the promotion and outside of her native Brazil.

Souza successfully defended the title against DeAnna Bennett at Invicta FC 15: Cyborg vs. Ibragimova on January 16, 2016. She won the fight via TKO due to a combination of body kick and punches.

In her second title defense, Souza faced Angela Hill at Invicta FC 17: Evinger vs. Schneider on May 7, 2016. She lost the five round bout by split decision.

Ultimate Fighting Championship
Souza signed with the UFC in October 2017 and was scheduled to face Jessica Aguilar on February 18, 2018, at UFC Fight Night: Cowboy vs. Medeiros.  However, Souza pulled out on February 10 due to a hand injury.

Souza faced Alex Chambers on September 22, 2018, at UFC Fight Night 137. She won the fight  via a guillotine choke in round one.

Souza faced promotional newcomer Sarah Frota on February 2, 2019, at UFC Fight Night 144. She won the fight by split decision.

Souza was scheduled to face Carla Esparza on April 27, 2019, at UFC Fight Night: Jacaré vs. Hermansson.  However, it was reported that Souza pulled out of the bout, citing ankle injury and she was replaced by current Virna Jandiroba.

Souza was scheduled to face Cynthia Calvillo on July 13, 2019, at UFC on ESPN+ 13. However, on June 7, 2019, it was reported that Calvillo was forced to pull out of the bout due to a broken foot and she was replaced by Brianna Van Buren. She lost the fight via unanimous decision.

Souza was expected to face Virna Jandiroba, replacing Cortney Casey, on December 7, 2019, at UFC on ESPN 7.  In turn Souza withdrew from the bout due to back injury and she was replaced by Mallory Martin

Souza faced Ashley Yoder on August 15, 2020, at UFC 252. She won the fight via unanimous decision.

Souza was expected to face promotional newcomer Kanako Murata on November 14, 2020, at UFC Fight Night: Felder vs. dos Anjos. However, Souza pulled out in early November due to an undisclosed injury and was replaced by Randa Markos.

Souza faced Amanda Lemos on March 6, 2021, at UFC 259. After being knocked down twice, she lost the fight via technical knockout in round one.

Souza faced Randa Markos on October 23, 2021, at UFC Fight Night 196. She lost the fight via unanimous decision.

On November 11, 2021, it was announced that Souza was no longer on the UFC roster.

Championships and accomplishments

Mixed martial arts
Invicta Fighting Championships
Invicta FC Strawweight Champion (one time; former)
One successful title defense
Fight of the Night (one time) vs. Janaisa Morandin
Performance of the Night (three times) vs. Katja Kankaanpää, DeAnna Bennett and Ayaka Hamasaki

Mixed martial arts record

|-
|Loss
|align=center|14–4
|Randa Markos
|Decision (unanimous)
|UFC Fight Night: Costa vs. Vettori 
|
|align=center|3
|align=center|5:00
|Las Vegas, Nevada, United States
|
|-
|Loss
|align=center|14–3
|Amanda Lemos
|TKO (punches)
|UFC 259 
|
|align=center|1
|align=center|3:39
|Las Vegas, Nevada, United States
|
|-
|Win
|align=center|14–2
|Ashley Yoder
|Decision (unanimous)
|UFC 252
|
|align=center|3
|align=center|5:00
|Las Vegas, Nevada, United States
|
|-
|Loss
|align=center|13–2
|Brianna Van Buren
|Decision (unanimous)
|UFC Fight Night: de Randamie vs. Ladd 
|
|align=center|3
|align=center|5:00
|Sacramento, California, United States
|
|-
|Win
|align=center|13–1
|Sarah Frota
|Decision (split)
|UFC Fight Night: Assunção vs. Moraes 2
|
|align=center|3
|align=center|5:00
|Fortaleza, Brazil 
|
|-
|Win
|align=center| 12–1
|Alex Chambers
|Submission (guillotine choke)
|UFC Fight Night: Santos vs. Anders 
|
|align=center|1
|align=center|1:21
|São Paulo, Brazil
|
|-
| Win
|align=center| 11–1
| Janaisa Morandin
| Decision (unanimous)
|Invicta FC 25: Kunitskaya vs. Pa'aluhi
|
|align=center|3
|align=center|5:00
|Lemoore, California, United States
|
|-
| Win
|align=center| 10–1
| Ayaka Hamasaki
| KO (punches)
|Invicta FC 22: Evinger vs. Kunitskaya II
|
|align=center|1
|align=center|1:41
|Kansas City, Missouri, United States
|
|-
| Loss
|align=center| 9–1
| Angela Hill
| Decision (split)
|Invicta FC 17: Evinger vs. Schneider
|
|align=center|5
|align=center|5:00
|Costa Mesa, California, United States
|
|-
| Win
|align=center| 9–0
| DeAnna Bennett
| TKO (body kick and punches)
|Invicta FC 15: Cyborg vs. Ibragimova
|
|align=center|1
|align=center|1:30
|Costa Mesa, California, United States
|
|-
| Win
|align=center| 8–0
| Katja Kankaanpää
| Submission (triangle choke)
|Invicta FC 12: Kankaanpää vs. Souza
|
|align=center|4
|align=center|3:58
|Kansas City, Missouri, United States
|
|-
| Win
|align=center| 7–0
| Camila Lima
| Submission (rear-naked choke)
|Talent MMA Circuit 12: Campinas 2014
|
|align=center|1
|align=center|0:47
|São Paulo, Brazil
|
|-
| Win
|align=center| 6–0
| Edlane Franca Godoy
| Submission (armbar)
|XFMMA 9
|
|align=center|1
|align=center|4:01
|São Paulo, Brazil
|
|-
| Win
|align=center| 5–0
| Bianca Reis
| Submission (triangle choke)
|Costa Combat MMA
|
|align=center|1
|align=center|0:42
|São Paulo, Brazil
|
|-
| Win
|align=center| 4–0
| Aline Sattelmayer
| Decision (unanimous)
|Talent MMA Circuit 4: Itatiba 2013
|
|align=center|3
|align=center|5:00
|São Paulo, Brazil
|
|-
| Win
|align=center| 3–0
| Andressa Rocha
| Submission (armbar)
|PFC 24
|
|align=center|2
|align=center|4:02
|São Paulo, Brazil
|
|-
| Win
|align=center| 2–0
| Aline Sattelmayer
| Submission (heel hook)
|XFMMA 26
|
|align=center|1
|align=center|0:24
|São Paulo, Brazil
|
|-
| Win
|align=center| 1–0
| Cindia Candela Faria
| Submission (armbar)
|PFC 23
|
|align=center|1
|align=center|2:35
|São Paulo, Brazil
|
|}

See also
 List of female mixed martial artists

References

External links
 
 
 Lívia Renata Souza at Invicta FC
 
 

1991 births
Living people
Brazilian practitioners of Brazilian jiu-jitsu
Female Brazilian jiu-jitsu practitioners
People awarded a black belt in Brazilian jiu-jitsu
Brazilian female mixed martial artists
LGBT mixed martial artists
Strawweight mixed martial artists
Mixed martial artists utilizing Brazilian jiu-jitsu
LGBT Brazilian jiu-jitsu practitioners
Ultimate Fighting Championship female fighters
Sportspeople from São Paulo
People from Araraquara